Ut ur discot och in i verkligheten is the third album by hardcore band LOK, released in 2002.

Track listing
 "Scudmissil (den lede fi)" - 2.50
 "Oj oj oj (hej då klick)" - 4.47
 "Ta stryk" - 2.22
 "Pyromandåd i ponnyslakteriet" - 3.17
 "Resterna av ditt liv" - 3.46
 "Jag tar för mig" - 2.26
 "Taftamanabag" - 2.25
 "Kom och se" - 4.34
 "Inte en enda risk" - 1.08  
 "Kapten Blau.Pf" - 1.44
 "Håll käften" - 0.19
 "Sug min" - 5.03

Credits

Band
 Martin Westerstrand – Vocals
 Thomas Brandt – Guitar
 Daniel Cordero – Bass
 Johan Reivén – Drums

2002 albums
LOK (band) albums